Sean Furey (born August 31, 1982) is an American Olympic javelin thrower with a personal best of 83.08 meters (272 feet, 7 inches).  He has placed in the top three at the U.S. National Championships six times, winning the javelin event in 2010, 2014 and 2015.  He represented the United States in international competition between 2009 and 2016, including 2 Olympic (2012, 2016), 2 World Championship (2009, 2015) and 2 Pan American (2011, 2015) teams. In 2009, at the World Championships in Berlin, Germany, Sean qualified for the final with a season best throw and ultimately finished 12th.

Early life 
Sean Furey was born August 31, 1982 to Kathy Furey (who later became Kathy Stupak by marriage).  He grew up in Methuen, Massachusetts with his younger brother Ryan and began throwing the javelin while at Methuen High School. He won two state javelin championships and in 2000, won the National Scholastic Championship.  During his senior season, Furey led his school to the Merrimack Valley Conference title and was named to the All-Scholastic team by the Boston Herald.  He graduated from Methuen in 2000.  Furey also played on the school's football team.

After high school, Furey attended Dartmouth.  He graduated in 2005 with a 3.80 GPA and an engineering degree.

Athletic career 
In 2005, he won the Ivy League championship and was named the "Scholar Athlete of the Year" by the U.S. Track & Field and Cross Country Coaches Association.

After college, Furey moved to San Diego to train. At the 2008 Olympic Trials, he placed seventh. At the World Championships, he was in fifth place among the "B" group after the qualification round of the javelin throw. However, he did not match that success in the final and finished in 12th place out of 12 competitors that made the final.

At the 2011 Pan American Games, Furey placed fourth.

At the 2012 Olympic Trials, Furey was battling a back injury.
He placed fourth, throwing the javelin . First and second place did not make the make standard, allowing Furey and fifth-place finisher Cyrus Hostetler to make the Olympic team. After the meet, he remarked "It's mixed emotions, fourth place vs. the Olympic team ... It's bittersweet. I just didn't execute like I needed."

Furey entered the 2012 Olympics with the longest throw by an American in 2012, and was ranked number 16 in the world.  He competed in the "B" group preliminary round of the javelin throw on August 8.  He placed 18th in his group and 37th overall and did not advance to the finals.

Furey is coached by former Olympian Todd Reich and sponsored by Mizuno.  "Todd is a talented guy," says Furey. "He knows what the elite javelin throwers are doing."  Furey says he has no plans to retire anytime soon.  "I won't quit until my arm falls off," he said.

Personal life 
Furey currently lives in San Diego, California with his wife Matthan "Mattie" Chatterton-Richmond.  He works part-time at Raytheon as a mechanical engineer doing what he describes as "bomb-proofing electronics" for the United States Navy.   When asked why he chose to continue pursuing the javelin, instead of concentrating on his higher paying engineering career, Furey remarked "Missing out on money, I don't care. We have everything we need and more. Making money won't make me happier. Being on the Olympic team will make me happier."

Competition record

Seasonal bests by year
2000 - 69.27
2001 - 62.09
2003 - 70.83
2004 - 73.18
2005 - 73.83
2006 - 73.43	
2007 - 74.10	
2008 - 80.45
2009 - 79.28	
2010 - 79.91
2011 - 81.62
2012 - 82.73
2013 - 80.04	
2014 - 81.24	
2015 - 83.08
2016 - 76.26

References

External links 
 
 

1982 births
Living people
American male javelin throwers
Athletes (track and field) at the 2012 Summer Olympics
Athletes (track and field) at the 2016 Summer Olympics
Olympic track and field athletes of the United States
Place of birth missing (living people)
Track and field athletes from San Diego
People from Methuen, Massachusetts
Sportspeople from Essex County, Massachusetts
Dartmouth Big Green men's track and field athletes
Athletes (track and field) at the 2015 Pan American Games
World Athletics Championships athletes for the United States
USA Outdoor Track and Field Championships winners
Pan American Games track and field athletes for the United States